This is a list of seasons completed by the Kansas Jayhawks men's college basketball team.

Season-by-season results
 
Updated March 18, 2023

Notes
   In 1919, Karl Schlademan coached, and won, the first game of the season before relinquishing the coaching position to Allen in order to concentrate on his duties as head track coach.
   In 1947, Howard Engleman coached 14 games (going 8–6) after Allen was ordered to take a rest following the 13th game of the season. Engleman was never officially a head coach at the university.
  In 2022, Bill Self served a four game suspension for recruiting violations. Norm Roberts was acting head coach during the suspension. Self also missed all 5 of the Jayhawks postseason games but received credit for the postseason victories.

References

Kansas Jayhawks
Kansas Jayhawks basketball seasons